USA-204, or Wideband Global SATCOM 2 (WGS-2) is a United States military communications satellite which is operated by the United States Air Force as part of the Wideband Global SATCOM programme. Launched in 2009, it was the second WGS satellite to reach orbit, and operates in geostationary orbit at a longitude of 60° East (Indian Ocean).

Overview 
The WGS system is a constellation of highly capable military communications satellites that leverage cost-effective methods and technological advances in the communications satellite industry. The WGS system is composed of three principal segments: Space Segment (satellites), Control Segment (operators) and Terminal Segment (users). Each WGS satellite provides service in multiple frequency bands, with the unprecedented ability to cross-band between the two frequencies on board the satellite. WGS augments other satellites.

In early 2001, a satellite communications industry team led by Boeing Satellite Systems was selected to develop the Wideband Gapfiller Satellite (WGS) system as successors to the Defense Satellite Communications System (DSCS) series of communications satellites. This satellite communications system is intended to support the warfighter with newer and far greater capabilities than provided by current systems. In March 2007, the acronym WGS was changed to Wideband Global SATCOM.

Just one WGS satellite provides more SATCOM capacity than the entire legacy Defense Satellite Communications System (DSCS) constellation.

Satellite description 
Built by Boeing Satellite Systems, WGS-2 is based on the BSS-702 satellite bus. The spacecraft is equipped with two solar arrays to generate power for its communications payload, which consists of cross-band X and Ka band transponders. Propulsion is provided by an R-4D-15 apogee motor, with four XIPS-25 ion engines for stationkeeping.

Launch 
USA-204 was launched by United Launch Alliance (ULA), using an Atlas V 421 launch vehicle. The launch occurred from Space Launch Complex 41 at the Cape Canaveral Air Force Station at 00:31:00 UTC on 4 April 2009,  and successfully placed the satellite into a geosynchronous transfer orbit, from which the it raised itself into geostationary orbit using its onboard propulsion system. The satellite was designated USA-204 under the US military's designation system, and received the International Designator 2009-017A and Satellite Catalog Number 34713.

References 

Spacecraft launched in 2009
USA satellites
Wideband Global SATCOM
Communications satellites in geostationary orbit